Brittleness is the liability of a material to fracture when subjected to stress.

Brittle or brittleness may also refer to:

 Brittle (food), a confection made of caramel and nuts
 Loch Brittle, on the coast of the Isle of Skye, Scotland
 Cliff Brittle, English businessman
 Software brittleness, a type of computer error

See also
 Brettle
 Brittle base class